"Electric Body" is a song by American hip hop recording artist ASAP Rocky, taken from Rocky's second studio album At. Long. Last. ASAP (2015). The song, produced by Hector Delgado with add prod by Danger Mouse and Teddy Walton, features a guest appearance from Rocky's frequent collaborator and fellow American rapper Schoolboy Q. Upon the release of the album, high downloads resulted in the song peaking at number 80 on the US Billboard Hot 100 chart.

Background 
On May 22, 2015 a tagged version of the song was leaked, by DJ Envy. The song marks the fifth collaboration between Rocky and Schoolboy Q, with the first being "Brand New Guy", from Rocky's first mixtape Live. Love. ASAP (2011), followed by "Hands on the Wheel" featured on Schoolboy Q's Habits & Contradictions (2012), then "PMW (All I Really Need)" from Rocky's debut album Long. Live. ASAP (2013), succeeded by "Californication", featured on Schoolboy Q's major-label debut Oxymoron (2014).

Live performances 
On July 3, 2015, Rocky performed "Electric Body" during his set at the Wireless Festival. In September 2015, he performed the song with Schoolboy Q on Jimmy Kimmel Live!.

Charts

Certifications

Release history

References

ASAP Rocky songs
2015 songs
Schoolboy Q songs
Songs written by ASAP Rocky
Songs written by Schoolboy Q
Song recordings produced by Danger Mouse (musician)
Songs written by Teddy Walton